The Colocongridae, the worm eels or short-tail eels are a family of eels, containing a single genus, Coloconger.

Colongrids are found in tropical waters of the Atlantic, Indian, and West Pacific oceans. Compared with other eels, they have relatively short and stubby bodies, with blunt snouts.

Species
The nine known species are:

Family Colocongridae
 Genus Coloconger
 Coloconger cadenati Kanazawa, 1961
 Coloconger canina (Castle & Raju, 1975)
 Coloconger eximia (Castle, 1967)
 Coloconger giganteus (Castle, 1959) (giant leptocephalus) (validity doubtful)
 Coloconger japonicus Machida, 1984
 Coloconger maculatus HO, H.-C. ., TANG, C.-N. ., & CHU, T.-W. . (2021) 
 Coloconger meadi Kanazawa, 1957
 Coloconger raniceps Alcock, 1889 (froghead eel)
 Coloconger saldanhai (Quéro, 2001)
 Coloconger scholesi W. L. Y. Chan, 1967 (Indo-Pacific short-tail conger)

See also
List of fish families

References

Eels